Emma White may refer to:

 Emma White (cyclist) (born 1997), American racing cyclist
 Emma White (gymnast) (born 1990), British artistic gymnast
 Emma Lee Smith White, member of the Virginia House of Delegates